John Ampontuah Kumah (born 4 August 1978) is a Ghanaian politician, entrepreneur, preacher and lawyer. He served as the Chief Executive Officer of the National Entrepreneurship and Innovation Programme (NEIP) until elected as the Member of parliament for the Ejisu constituency in the 2020 Ghanaian general election on the ticket New Patriotic Party (NPP).

Early life and education 
John was born on 4 August 1978. He hails from Ejisu Odaho, a farming community in the Ejisu municipality in the Ashanti Region of Ghana. Kuma attended Opoku Ware School, Kumasi for his secondary school education. He continued to the University of Ghana (Legon) in 1997 and was awarded a Bachelor of Arts in Economics with Philosophy. In 2009, he was awarded an MBA (Finance) from GIMPA. He also has a Degree in Law (LLB) from the University of Ghana and a Professional Law Degree (BL) from the Ghana School of Law. He also had his Post Graduate Diploma in Applied Business Research from the Nobel International Business School in 2019.

In November 2020, John Ampontuah Kumah received a Doctorate in Business Innovation from the Swiss Business School in Switzerland. He also has a Masters in Applied Research (Business Innovation) from the same institute.

Career 
In 2013, He was admitted to the Ghana Bar as a Solicitor and Legal Practitioner for the Supreme Court of Ghana. He is a founding  member and Managing Partner of Aduaprokye Chambers, a Law Firm located at Adabraka. He also worked as the founder of Majak Associates Ltd, a building and construction company, until his appointment as the CEO of NEIP in 2017. John Ampontuah Kumah has over fifteen (15) years’ experience in leadership, creativity, innovation and resourcefulness in creating jobs, and supporting youth development.

Politics 
In 2020, John Kumah contested and won the Parliamentary seat for the Ejisu constituency on the ticket of the New Patriotic Party (NPP). Kumah is currently the Deputy Minister of Finance.

Committees 
Kumah is the Vice Chairperson of the Constitutional, Legal and Parliamentary Affairs Committee and also a member of the Appointments and Subsidiary Legislation committees.

Personal life 
John is married to Apostle Mrs. Lilian Kumah who is the Founder and Senior Pastor of Disciple of Christ Ministries Worldwide. They have six (6) biological children and many other foster children.

Honors and awards 
John Kumah was adjudged most efficient, prominent appointee for 2018 and was also listed among President Akufo Addo's top 20 Most Humble and respectful Appointees In 2019.

John Kumah honored for being Most Outstanding Integrity CEO. The Africa Centre for Integrity and Development (ACID), an Africa-based anti-corruption and Good Governance advocacy Civil Society Organization, presented an award to John Kumah for the most outstanding Integrity CEO in June 20.

Lawyer John Kumah on Friday the 23rd of August received yet another award as the most outstanding CEO and Influential Transformational Leader from GEHAB Events

The All African Student Union (AASU)  honored the former Chief Executive of National Entrepreneurship and Innovative Plan-NEIP at its 6th summit in Ghana for his extraordinary zeal of promoting students activism and entrepreneurship.

Philanthropy 
In August 2022, Kumah made payments for five different sets of prosthesis for some victims of road accidents. They were Peter Mensah and Moses Addai.

References 

Living people
Ghanaian MPs 2021–2025
University of Ghana alumni
21st-century Ghanaian lawyers
Ghana School of Law alumni
New Patriotic Party politicians
1978 births